Olympic Club Châteaudun is a French association football club founded in 1959 as a result of a merger between ES Châteaudun and AS Saint-Jean. They are based in the town of Châteaudun and their home stadium is the Stade Kléber et Albert Provost, which has a capacity of around 3,300 spectators. As of the 2009–10 season, the club plays in the Division d'Honneur Regionale de Centre, the seventh tier of French football.

External links
OC Châteaudun information at footballenfrance.fr 

Chateaudun
Chateaudun
1959 establishments in France
Sport in Eure-et-Loir
Football clubs in Centre-Val de Loire